Francesco Acri (19 March 1834, in Catanzaro – 21 November 1913, in Bologna) was an Italian philosopher and historian of philosophy.

Biography 
After graduating with a degree in jurisprudence at Naples in 1857 and studying Aristotle and Kant at Berlin under Friedrich Adolf Trendelenburg, he became a teacher of the history of philosophy, first at the University of Palermo and then, from 1871 at the University of Bologna, where he remained until 1911.

Bound to Rosminian spiritualism, he engaged in invective with the Hegelians and the positivists, in a long dispute with his predecessor in the Bolognese chair, Francesco Fiorentino.

Politically a clerical, he was elected as a city councilor in Bologna in 1895, he campaigned against divorce and for the introduction of the catechism in schools, and was also a strenuous defender of the participation of Catholics in public life.

Among his major scholarly writings, the translation and commentary on the Dialogues of Plato (various partial editions, collected in three volumes between 1913 and 1915).

His tomb is in the Certosa di Bologna. On the stone dedicated to him, the following memorial is written:

FRANCESCO ACRI
DAL 1871 PROFESSORE ALL'UNIVERSITÀDI STORIA DELLA FILOSOFIANOBILE CUORE E ALTO INGEGNOPADRE TRA I FIGLIUOLI E I NIPOTI SUOIPADRE TRA GLI SCOLARISPECULATORE DI VERITÀ SEGUACE DI BONTÀAMICO DI BELLEZZAFILOSOFO E ARTISTAITALIANO DI ANIMA E DI LINGUADEVOTO A PLATONE A TOMMASO A DANTEDALLA FEDEA CUI GLI PARVE FACILE CONCILIARE LA SCIENZAIN CUI RIPOSÒ L'INTELLETTO E L'AFFETTO

Works 
Abbozzo d'una teorica delle idee [Sketch of a Theory of Ideas], Palermo, 1870
Della teoria dell'idee secondo Giambattista Vico [On the Theory of Ideas, According to Giambattista Vico], Bologna, 1873
Dell'insegnamento di religione nelle scuole primarie: lettera del prof. Acri ai membri del Congresso pedagogico di Bologna [On the Teaching of Religion in Primary Schools: Letters of Prof. Acri to the Members of the Bologna Education Board], Modena, 1874
Della relazione fra la coscienza e il corpo secondo le dottrine chiamate positive [On the Relation between the Mind and the Body According to the Doctrines called Positivist], Bologna, 1880
La Eucarestia e la scienza [The Eucharist and Science], Chieti, 1897
Videmus in aenigmate: delle idee e prima della relazione tra la coscienza e il corpo secondo i filosofi naturali We see in Obscurity: On ideas and prior relations between the mind and the body according to natural philosophy, Bologna, 1907
Amore, dolore, fede [Love, Pain, Faith], Bologna, 1908
San Tommaso e Aristotele [Saint Thomas Aquinas & Aristotle], Bologna, 1908
Dialettica turbata [Dialectic Disturbed], Bologna, 1911
Dialettica serena, [Dialectic at Peace]Rocca San Casciano, 1917 (posthumous)

Translation 
 Plato, Dialogues, 1913–15, 3 vol.

Bibliography 
 
S. Blasucci, Francesco Acri: la fortuna e l'opera, Roma-Bari, 1992
F. Farnè, Il problema esistenziale nel pensiero di Francesco Acri, L'Aquila, 1984
L. Malusa, Persona, sistema e sviluppo della filosofia nella storiografia filosofica di Francesco Acri, in «AA. VV., Vetera novis augere. Studi in onore di C. Giacon», Roma, 1982
L. Monetti, Saggio sul pensiero filosofico di Francesco Acri, Torino, 1957
Renato Serra, Francesco Acri, in Scritti, t. II, G De Robertis, A Grilli (ed.s), Firenze, Le Monnier, 1938

External links

(Acri's Platonic dialogue translations)

Francesco Corvino, «ACRI, Francesco» in Dizionario Biografico degli Italiani, Volume 1, Roma, Istituto dell'Enciclopedia Italiana, 1960.
Necrologio di Francesco Acri sull'Annuario dell'Università di Bologna, p. 287.

Italian philosophers
1834 births
1913 deaths
People from Catanzaro
Academic staff of the University of Palermo
Academic staff of the University of Bologna
Italian historians of philosophy
Italian translators
Translators to Italian
19th-century translators
Giambattista Vico scholars